The Knoxville Symphony Orchestra is a professional orchestra in Knoxville, Tennessee.

The orchestra was established in 1935 and is the oldest continuing orchestra in the southeastern United States. The founding conductor was Bertha Walburn Clark, who led the group until 1946. Other former conductors were Lamar Stringfield (1946-1947 season), David Van Vactor (1947 to 1972), Arpad Joó (1973-1978), Zoltán Rozsnyai (1978-1985), Kirk Trevor (1985-2003), and Lucas Richman (2003-2015). The KSO has been led by Aram Demirjian since 2016.

Underneath the KSO umbrella, a highly successful youth orchestra was established in 1975, known as the Knoxville Symphony Youth Orchestra (KSYO). They are currently conducted by James Fellenbaum.

See also

Knoxville Opera

References

External links
Knoxville Symphony Orchestra official site

Musical groups established in 1935
Culture of Knoxville, Tennessee
American orchestras
Tourist attractions in Knoxville, Tennessee
Performing arts in Tennessee
Musical groups from Knoxville, Tennessee